Mark Lemmer (born 27 April 1967) is a British former auto racing driver, who is also presently the managing director of the family run Barwell Motorsport racing team which was set up by his father Richard. The team have run cars in different disciplines around the world, in 2008 they entered Aston Martins in the American Le Mans Series. They plan to contest in the European Le Mans Series in 2009.

Racing career

Barwell Motorsport was set up in the 1960s as Barwell Automotive Ltd by Paul Butler and Richard Lemmer. Paul Butler raced an ex-Alan Jones Brabham BT28 in F3 and Formula Alanticin the 1970s.

He started racing in various one make series including Mazdas and Volkswagen Polos. His first title came in 1994 when he became champion of the Scottish Mutual Volkswagen Vento VR6 Challenge. After finishing third in the 1995 championship, he drove in the 1996 TVR Tuscan challenge, which included one podium finish. He finished third on points in the 1997 Vauxhall Vectra SRi V6 Challenge, with one race win.

In 1998 he raced in the British Touring Car Championship. He raced a Vauxhall Vectra in the Michelin Cup for Independents with Mint Motorsport. With three independent wins, he ended the year fourth place in his class. After a year in the National Saloon Cup, he returned to the BTCC in 2000 with a Honda Integra in the newly formed Class B. One class win for the Barwell team in round seven at Knockhill was enough to see him finish third behind team mate James Kaye. He entered just four rounds in 2001, with a Production Class Honda Accord for Synchro Motorsport.

After the BTCC his racing has included the Britcar Endurance series and Historic Racing events. His latest drive was in for the works Mitsubishi rally team in the 2008 Britcar 24-Hour race at Silverstone.

Racing record

Complete British Touring Car Championship results
(key) Races in bold indicate pole position (1 point awarded - 2000-01 in class) Races in italics indicate fastest lap (1 point awarded - 2001 only, 2000-01 in class) * signifies that driver lead feature race for at least one lap (1 point awarded - 2001 in class)

Complete 24 Hours of Spa results

Complete 24 Hours of Silverstone results

References

British Touring Car Championship drivers
Britcar 24-hour drivers
24 Hours of Spa drivers
Living people
24H Series drivers
1967 births